Dorothy Hart (April 4, 1922 – July 11, 2004) was an American actress, mostly in supporting roles. She portrayed Howard Duff's fiancée in the film The Naked City (1948).

Early life
Born in Cleveland, Ohio, Hart was the daughter of insurance executive Walter Hart and Mary Hart.

Hart attended Denison University for one year before graduating from Case Western Reserve University with a B.A. degree. She was also a member of Kappa Alpha Theta. After gaining some experience at the Cleveland Play House she decided on a singing career.

In 1944, a newspaper friend submitted her photo in the Columbia Pictures "National Cinderella Cover Girl Contest of 1944." Hart had saved enough money to go to New York when she learned that she was high on the list of Cover Girl finalists. After winning the contest, the studio paid for her trip in August 1944, and she was given a screen test for the Rita Hayworth film Tonight and Every Night, as her contest award.

Winning the "National Cinderella Cover Girl Contest" brought with it a contract for Hart to be a model with the Harry Conover agency, which in turn led to pictures of her "appearing in fashionable magazines all over the world."

Film career
On August 25, 1946, Hart signed a contract with Columbia Pictures. Her first big movie break came, starring alongside Randolph Scott and Barbara Britton in the Western, Gunfighters (1947), a Cinecolor film for Columbia.

While filming in October, 1946 Hart was sent home from location with an illness which was diagnosed as influenza. In February, 1947 she was  injured during horseback sequences in Arizona. Minor corrective surgery was performed at Cedars of Lebanon Hospital in Los Angeles, California.  The Painted Desert was one of the main sites utilized for this movie. Barbara Britton played the female lead in the adventure drama with Hart heading up the supporting cast.

Columnist Hedda Hopper reported in a June 1947 column that Mary Pickford was suing Dorothy Hart for a sum of $79,000 because the young actress refused to accept a role in the film There Goes Lona Henry. Pickford stated in an interview that she hoped to take an unknown girl and make her into a great star. Hart refused the role because she did not want to sign away seven years of her career for a single movie opportunity.

Hart made Larceny (1948), with Shelley Winters and The Countess of Monte Cristo (also 1948) with Sonja Henie, both for Universal Pictures. She co-starred in The Naked City, starring Barry Fitzgerald, which premiered on March 10, 1948. She played the bad girl who double crosses her fiancé in  William Castle’s Undertow (1949).

Hart became the tenth actress to portray Jane when she appeared opposite Lex Barker as Tarzan in Tarzan's Savage Fury (1952). She also co-starred in Outside the Wall (1950) and I Was a Communist for the FBI (1951), playing a Communist schoolteacher who eventually repudiates the party.

United Nations
In 1952, Hart left acting to work with the American Association for the United Nations in New York. The organization's first female entertainer, she spoke at the United Nations and was an observer at the 1957-1958 meeting of the World Federation of United Nations in Geneva.

Personal life
Hart was twice married and divorced. With Frederick Pittera, she had a son, Douglas (born 1961).

Dorothy Hart died of Alzheimer's disease on July 11, 2004, in Asheville, North Carolina, at age 82. She was survived by her son, a sister, and three grandchildren.

Filmography

Notes

References

External links

1922 births
2004 deaths
Deaths from Alzheimer's disease
Neurological disease deaths in North Carolina
Actresses from Cleveland
Actors from Shaker Heights, Ohio
American film actresses
20th-century American actresses
Denison University alumni
Case Western Reserve University alumni
21st-century American women